Modal Soul is the second full-length album by Japanese hip-hop artist Nujabes, released on November 11, 2005, on Nujabes' own record label Hydeout Productions. Like its predecessor, Metaphorical Music, Modal Soul fuses jazzy, smooth rhythms and hip hop. The album features artists Cise Starr and Akin (of CYNE), Terry Callier, Shing02, Substantial, Pase Rock, Apani B and Uyama Hiroto. It was the final studio album released during Nujabes' lifetime.

Track listing

References 

Albums produced by Nujabes
Nujabes albums
Instrumental albums
Instrumental hip hop albums
2005 albums